Turtle Boy may refer to:

 A statue of a young boy riding a turtle on the Burnside Fountain in Worcester, Massachusetts, U.S.
 A persona of DC Comics character Jimmy Olsen
 The Turtle Boy and The Turtle Boy: Peregrine's Tale, novellas by Kealan Patrick Burke

See also
 Turtle Bay (disambiguation)